Rozītis (Old orthography: Rosi(h)t; feminine: Rozīte) is a Latvian surname. Individuals with the surname include:

Jānis Rozītis (1913–1942), Latvian football forward
Pāvils Rozītis (1889–1937), Latvian writer, journalist and translator
Reinis Rozītis (born 1982), Latvian bobsledder

Latvian-language masculine surnames